Hampala is a genus of ray-finned fish in the family Cyprinidae found in South-East Asia.

Species
 Hampala ampalong (Bleeker, 1852)
 Hampala bimaculata (Popta, 1905)
 Hampala dispar H. M. Smith, 1934 (Hampala Endemic Pelalawan, Tambak River, Riau Indonesia)
 Hampala lopezi Herre, 1924
 Hampala macrolepidota Kuhl & van Hasselt, 1823 (Hampala Barb)
 Hampala sabana Inger & P. K. Chin, 1962
 Hampala salweenensis A. Doi & Y. Taki, 1994

References

External links

 Hampala Barb
 Southeast Asian Fisheries - Hampala macrolepidota
 A New Cyprinid Fish, Hampala salweenensis, from the Mae Pai River

Cyprinid fish of Asia
Cyprinidae genera
Taxonomy articles created by Polbot